These are the results of the 2019 NACAC U23 Championships in Athletics which took place on July 5, 6, and 7 at the Parque Queretaro 2000 in Querétaro City, Mexico.

Men's results

100 meters

Heats – July 5Wind:Heat 1: ? m/s, Heat 2: 0.0 m/s, Heat 3: 0.0 m/s

Final – July 5Wind:+1.1 m/s

200 meters

Heats – July 6Wind:Heat 1: +2.8 m/s, Heat 2: +0.3 m/s, Heat 3: +2.6 m/s

Final – July 7Wind:+0.8 m/s

400 meters

Heats – July 5

Final – July 6

800 meters
July 6

1500 meters
July 7

5000 meters
July 5

10,000 meters
July 7

110 meters hurdles

Heats – July 5Wind:Heat 1: +0.8 m/s, Heat 2: +2.4 m/s

Final – July 5Wind:+2.7 m/s

400 meters hurdles

Heats – July 5

Final – July 5

3000 meters steeplechase
July 6

4 × 100 meters relay
July 6

10,000 meters walk
July 6

High jump
July 7

Pole vault
July 6

Long jump
July 5

Triple jump
July 6

Shot put
July 6

Discus throw
July 5

Hammer throw
July 6

Javelin throw
July 7

Women's results

100 meters

Heats – July 5Wind:Heat 1: +1.4 m/s, Heat 2: +1.5 m/s

Final – July 5Wind:+3.3 m/s

200 meters
July 7Wind: +1.6 m/s

400 meters

Heats – July 5

Final – July 6

800 meters
July 6

1500 meters
July 7

5000 meters
July 5

10,000 meters
July 7

100 meters hurdles

Heats – July 6Wind:Heat 1: +1.6 m/s, Heat 2: +0.7 m/s

Final – July 6Wind:+1.7 m/s

400 meters hurdles
July 5

3000 meters steeplechase
July 6

4 × 100 meters relay
July 6

5000 meters walk
July 5

High jump
July 6

Pole vault
July 6

Long jump
July 5

Triple jump
July 5

Shot put
July 6

Discus throw
July 5

Hammer throw
July 5

Javelin throw
July 6

Mixed results

4 × 400 meters relay
July 7

References

NACAC Under-23 Championships in Athletics
Events at the NACAC Under-23 Championships in Athletics